Boston Mills/Brandywine Ski Resorts are a pair of sister ski resorts, owned by Vail Resorts, in Northeastern Ohio.

History 
The two locations were developed independently in the 1960s. In 1990, Brandywine was purchased by the owners of Boston Mills, forming the dual-resort complex known today. In 2002 Peak Resorts purchased the resorts and owned and operated them until 2019. Vail bought out BMBW as well as Peak’s other 15 resorts. Resort operations are housed at Boston Mills. Boston Mills is the primary resort, attracting more advanced skiers with steeper, more challenging hills, two mogul fields, a race hill, and more adult traffic and live entertainment. Boston Mills features the steepest slope in the state of Ohio, the mogul studded "Tiger". Boston Mills even had some tree runs that appeared with the falling of natural snow. These runs were known as the "Ol 76er", "The Trench" and "Tiger's Fang", and have been closed for most of recent history.  Professional freestyle and freeskier, Glen Plake has skied "Tiger" at Boston Mills and called it a "great run for a mogul course".  Boston Mills was also home to "Winter Carnival", a giant end of season party that has featured a slosh pit, mogul competitions, big air competitions, sickest trick competitions, fire hose races, bikini races, sled races, beer keg races, costume contests and fireworks displays. 

In 2018, Red Gerard, who began his snowboarding career at Brandywine while living in Rocky River, won the Gold Medal in Snowboarding Slopestyle.  

Brandywine, located about a mile away from Boston Mills. It has approximately 1.5x more skiable acres and caters more to the younger crowd with its better beginner and intermediate terrain of the two resorts. With two terrain parks of different difficulty levels Brandwine is a more safety and skill focused freestyle snowsports facility offering a freestyle boot camp for kids and a women's discovery snowboarding program. Brandywine also features a lodge constructed in 2012, and often hosts late night ski sessions on Friday and Saturday nights geared towards the college crowd.  

In September of 2019 the Peak Resorts was purchased by Vail Resorts. Now Boston Mills Ski Resort and Brandywine Ski Resort are under new ownership.

Features 
Between both resorts (only a few miles apart, with each visible from the other's peak), there are 18 trails of various skill levels:

Boston Mills
3 Advanced
2 Intermediate
2 Beginner
1 Double lifts
5 Triple lifts
1 Magic Carpet
1 Tow rope

Brandywine
3 Advanced
3 intermediate
3 Beginner
2 Dedicated Terrain Park runs
1 Tubing park
3 Triple lifts
2 Quadruple lifts
1 Magic Carpet
2 Tow Ropes

The tubing park is named Polar Blast and is located at Brandywine. It features up to 20 lanes that stretch over "3 football fields in length." Polar Blast also has conveyor lifts so tubers do not have to walk back to the top of the hill.

The Brandywine Ski Resort is located at  a little more than one mile to the north, in Sagamore Hills Township, Summit County, Ohio.

References 

Ski areas and resorts in Ohio
Vail Resorts
Buildings and structures in Summit County, Ohio
Tourist attractions in Summit County, Ohio
Sports in Summit County, Ohio